The Pharmacy Council of India (PCI) is the statutory body under Ministry of Health and Family Welfare, Government of India.
It is constituted under the Pharmacy Act, 1948. The Council was first constituted on 4 March 1948. Dr. Montukumar Patel is elected as new president.

Members
The Pharmacy Council of India is constituted by central government every five years. .
There are three types of members collectively forms a frame of PCI
 Elected members
One member is elected by"Medical council of India".
One "registered pharmacist" elected by state council. 
 Nominated members
 Ex-officio members

Objectives
The objectives of the PCI are:-  
 To regulate the pharmacy education in the Country. 
 To allow the registration as a pharmacist under the pharmacy act.
 To regulate the profession and practice of pharmacy.

Main functions of PCI
The main functions of the PCI are:
 To prescribe minimum standard of education required for qualifying as a pharmacist. (Ref.: section 10 of the Pharmacy Act)  
 Framing of Education Regulations prescribing the conditions to be fulfilled by the institutions seeking approval of the PCI for imparting education in pharmacy. (Ref.: section 10 of the Pharmacy Act)
 To ensure uniform implementation of the educational standards throughout the country. (Ref. : section 10 of the Pharmacy Act)
 Inspection of Pharmacy Institutions seeking approval under the Pharmacy Act to verify availability of the prescribed norms. (Ref.: section 16 of the Pharmacy Act)
 To approve the course of study and examination for pharmacists i.e. approval of the academic training institutions providing pharmacy courses. (Ref. : section 12 of the Pharmacy Act)
 To withdraw approval, if the approved course of study or an approved examination does not continue to be in conformity with the educational standards prescribed by the PCI. (Ref.: section 13 of the Pharmacy Act)
 To approve qualifications granted outside the territories to which the Pharmacy Act extends i.e. the approval of foreign qualification. (Ref. : section 14 of the Pharmacy Act)
 To maintain Central Register of Pharmacists. (Ref. : section 15 A of the Pharmacy Act)

References

Pharmacy organisations in India
Medical and health government agencies of India
Ministry of Health and Family Welfare
1948 establishments in India
Government agencies established in 1948